The 2018 IIHF World Championship Division II was an international ice hockey tournament run by the International Ice Hockey Federation. Group A was contested in Tilburg, Netherlands from 23 to 29 April 2018 and Group B in Granada, Spain from 14 to 20 April 2018.

The Netherlands were promoted to Division I B and Iceland was relegated to Group B. Spain claimed the top position in the Group B tournament and returned to Group A after one year, while Luxembourg took the reverse route after being relegated to Division III.

Group A tournament

Participants

Match officials
4 referees and 7 linesmen were selected for the tournament.

Referees
 Andrea Benvegnu
 Miklós Haszonits
 Sergey Morozov
 Tomasz Radzik

Linesmen
 Knut Einar Bråten
 Tomislav Grozaj
 Raivis Jučers
 Kensuke Kanazawa
 Jos Korte
 Ian McCambridge
 Stef Oosterling

Standings

Results
All times are local (UTC+2).

Awards and statistics

Awards
Best players selected by the directorate:
Best Goalkeeper:  Anthony Kimlin
Best Defenseman:  Giovanni Vogelaar
Best Forward:  Ivy van den Heuvel
Source: IIHF.com

Scoring leaders
List shows the top skaters sorted by points, then goals.

GP = Games played; G = Goals; A = Assists; Pts = Points; +/− = Plus/minus; PIM = Penalties in minutes; POS = Position
Source: IIHF.com

Leading goaltenders
Only the top five goaltenders, based on save percentage, who have played at least 40% of their team's minutes, are included in this list.

TOI = Time on ice (minutes:seconds); SA = Shots against; GA = Goals against; GAA = Goals against average; Sv% = Save percentage; SO = Shutouts
Source: IIHF.com

Group B tournament

Participants

Match officials
4 referees and 7 linesmen were selected for the tournament.

Referees
 Jevgēņijs Griškevičs
 Milan Novák
 Rasmus Toppel
 Tim Tzirtziganis

Linesmen
 Alejandro García
 Marcus Höfer
 Andrey Korovkin
 Jiří Svoboda
 Carlos Trobajo
 Chris van Grinsven

Standings

Results
All times are local (UTC+2).

Awards and statistics

Awards
Best players selected by the directorate:
Best Goalkeeper:  Ander Alcaine
Best Defenseman:  Stefan Helmersson
Best Forward:  Patricio Fuentes
Source: IIHF.com

Scoring leaders
List shows the top skaters sorted by points, then goals.

GP = Games played; G = Goals; A = Assists; Pts = Points; +/− = Plus/minus; PIM = Penalties in minutes; POS = Position
Source: IIHF.com

Leading goaltenders
Only the top five goaltenders, based on save percentage, who have played at least 40% of their team's minutes, are included in this list.

TOI = Time on ice (minutes:seconds); SA = Shots against; GA = Goals against; GAA = Goals against average; Sv% = Save percentage; SO = Shutouts
Source: IIHF.com

References

2018
Division II
2018 IIHF World Championship Division II
2018 IIHF World Championship Division II
2018 IIHF World Championship Division II
2018 IIHF World Championship Division II
2018 in Dutch sport
2018 in Spanish sport
April 2018 sports events in Europe